The 2012 Hong Kong Cricket Sixes was the eighteenth edition of the Hong Kong Cricket Sixes, took place at Kowloon Cricket Club, Hong Kong. Eight teams competing in the tournament which lasted over two days from 27 to 28 October 2012. The tournament also featured China cricket team playing an exhibition match with a Hong Kong development team. The previous tournament was won by Pakistan who defeated England in the final.

Squads

Standing and Prize Money

Rules and regulations
All standard laws of the game as laid down by the MCC applied with the following significant differences:

General
Games are played between two teams of six players, and consist of five overs of six balls, with the exception of the final which consists of five overs of eight balls.  Each member of the fielding side, with the exception of the wicket-keeper shall bowl one over.  Wides and no-balls count as two runs to the batting side, plus an extra ball.

Last man stands
If five wickets fall (not including batsmen retiring not out) before the allocated overs have been completed, the remaining batsman continues, with the last batsman out remaining as a runner.  The not out batsman shall always face strike, and shall be declared out if his partner is declared out.

Batsman retire
A batsman must retire not out on reaching 31 runs, but not before.  He may complete all runs scored on the ball on which he reaches his 31, and retire immediately after.  If one of the last pair of batsmen is out, any remaining not out batsman may resume his innings.  In the case where there is more than one, they must return in the order they retired.

Fixtures and results
All times shown are in Hong Kong Time (UTC+08:00).

Group stage

Pool A

 *Runs per legitimate ball faced (i.e. excludes wides and no-balls)

Pool B

 *Runs per legitimate ball faced (i.e. excludes wides and no-balls)

Plate Knockout stage

Plate Semi-finals

Plate Final

Cup Round Robin stage

 *Run-rate carries over from the first day's play.

Final

Notes
 ** is used to signify that a batsman was forced to retire not out as his personal score was 31 or more.

References
Hong Kong Cricket Sixes

Hong Kong Cricket Sixes